Berlin Township, Ohio may refer to:

Berlin Township, Erie County, Ohio
Berlin Township, Delaware County, Ohio
Berlin Township, Holmes County, Ohio
Berlin Township, Knox County, Ohio
Berlin Township, Mahoning County, Ohio

See also
Berlin, Ohio (disambiguation)

Ohio township disambiguation pages